Henry B. Ransom (February 25, 1911 – December 21, 1987) was an American professional golfer who played on the PGA Tour in the 1940s and 1950s.

Ransom was born in Houston, Texas. He turned professional in 1933. He won five PGA Tour events during his career, and was a member of the 1951 Ryder Cup team. His best finishes in the major championships were a T-5 at the 1950 U.S. Open and at the 1953 and 1956 PGA Championships (lost in quarter-finals of match play).

At a tournament in Texas in 1948, Ransom was involved in a fist-fight with one of his playing partners, the diminutive, short-tempered Australian Norman Von Nida that resulted in police having to pull them apart.

Ransom was forced off the tour in the late 1950s because of an allergy to grass. After retiring as a tour player, he coached the Texas A&M University golf team from 1959 to 1973, winning six Southwest Conference titles. He was also a golf course architect; his designs included Idylwild Golf Club in Sour Lake, Texas.

Professional wins

PGA Tour wins (5)
1946 St. Paul Open
1949 Wilmington Open
1950 World Championship of Golf
1951 Inverness Invitational Four-Ball (with Roberto De Vicenzo)
1955 Rubber City Open

Other wins
this list may be incomplete
1945 Long Island Open
1948 Illinois PGA Championship

Results in major championships

Note: Ransom never played in The Open Championship.

NT = no tournament
WD = withdrew
CUT = missed the half-way cut
R64, R32, R16, QF, SF = round in which player lost in PGA Championship match play
"T" indicates a tie for a place

Summary

Most consecutive cuts made – 8 (1941 U.S. Open – 1949 PGA)
Longest streak of top-10s – 1 (five times)

References

American male golfers
PGA Tour golfers
Ryder Cup competitors for the United States
Golf course architects
College golf coaches in the United States
Golfers from Houston
Texas A&M Aggies men's golf coaches
1911 births
1987 deaths